Streamline diffusion, given an advection-diffusion equation, refers to all diffusion going on along the advection direction.

Diffusion

References